The 1981–82 daytime network television schedule for the three major English-language commercial broadcast networks in the United States covers the weekday and weekend daytime hours from September 1981 to August 1982.

Legend

 New series are highlighted in bold.

Schedule
 All times correspond to U.S. Eastern and Pacific Time scheduling (except for some live sports or events). Except where affiliates slot certain programs outside their network-dictated timeslots, subtract one hour for Central, Mountain, Alaska, and Hawaii-Aleutian times.
 Local schedules may differ, as affiliates have the option to pre-empt or delay network programs. Such scheduling may be limited to preemptions caused by local or national breaking news or weather coverage (which may force stations to tape delay certain programs to other timeslots) and any major sports events scheduled to air in a weekday timeslot (mainly during major holidays). Stations may air shows at other times at their preference.

Monday–Friday

Notes
 Search for Tomorrow was cancelled by CBS in late 1981, and ended its run on CBS on March 26, 1982. It moved to NBC with its first episode the following Monday, March 29. It is the second instance of a daytime soap opera switching networks, with The Edge of Night first doing-so from CBS to ABC in late 1975.
ABC had a 6PM (ET)/5PM (CT) feed for World News Tonight, depending on stations' schedule. By Spring 1982 it would be discontinued.

Saturday

In the News aired ten times during CBS' Saturday morning shows.

Ask NBC News aired after the credits of NBC's Saturday morning shows except Spider-Man and His Amazing Friends and The Bullwinkle Show.

Sunday

By network

ABC

Returning series
ABC Weekend Special
ABC World News Tonight
All My Children
American Bandstand
Animals, Animals, Animals
Family Feud
The Fonz and the Happy Days Gang
General Hospital
Good Morning America
Heathcliff
Issues and Answers
Kids Are People Too
The Love Boat 
One Life to Live
The Richie Rich/Scooby-Doo Show and Scrappy Too!
Ryan's Hope
Schoolhouse Rock!
Super Friends
Thundarr the Barbarian

New series
ABC News This Morning
Goldie Gold and Action Jack
Laverne & Shirley in the Army
This Week with David Brinkley

Canceled/Ended
The Plasticman/Baby Plas Super Comedy
Three's Company

CBS

Returning series
30 Minutes
Alice 
As the World Turns
The Bugs Bunny/Road Runner Show
Captain Kangaroo
CBS Children's Film Festival
CBS Evening News
CBS Morning News
CBS News Sunday Morning
Drak Pack 
Face the Nation
The New Fat Albert Show
Guiding Light
The New Adventures of Mighty Mouse and Heckle & Jeckle 
One Day at a Time 
The Popeye and Olive Comedy Show
The Price Is Right
Search for Tomorrow (moved to NBC)
Sunrise Semester
The Tarzan/Lone Ranger/Zorro Adventure Hour
The Tom and Jerry Comedy Show 
The Young and the Restless

New series
Blackstar
Capitol
The Kwicky Koala Show
Tattletales
Trollkins

Canceled/Ended
Jason of Star Command 
The Jeffersons 
The Robonic Stooges 
The Skatebirds

NBC

Returning series
Another World
Blockbusters
The Bullwinkle Show 
The Daffy/Speedy Show
Days of Our Lives
The Doctors
The Flintstone Comedy Show
Gambit (renamed Las Vegas Gambit)
Meet the Press
NBC Nightly News
Password Plus
Search for Tomorrow (moved from CBS)
Texas
Today
Wheel of Fortune

New series
Battlestars
CHiPs 
Diff'rent Strokes 
The Kid Super Power Hour with Shazam!
The Regis Philbin Show
The Smurfs
Space Stars
Spider-Man and His Amazing Friends
Sport Billy

Canceled/Ended
Batman and the Super 7
Card Sharks
The Daffy Duck Show
Godzilla 
The Godzilla / Dynomutt Hour 
Hong Kong Phooey 
The Jetsons 
Jonny Quest

See also
1981-82 United States network television schedule (prime-time)
1981-82 United States network television schedule (late night)

Sources
https://web.archive.org/web/20071015122215/http://curtalliaume.com/abc_day.html
https://web.archive.org/web/20071015122235/http://curtalliaume.com/cbs_day.html
https://web.archive.org/web/20071012211242/http://curtalliaume.com/nbc_day.html

United States weekday network television schedules
1981 in American television
1982 in American television